The 1992 Individual Ice Speedway World Championship was the 27th edition of the World Championship  The Championship was held on 7/8 March, 1992 in Frankfurt in Germany. 

Yuri Ivanov riding under the banner of the Commonwealth of Independent States (due to the Dissolution of the Soviet Union) won her third world title.

Classification

See also 
 1992 Individual Speedway World Championship in classic speedway
 1992 Team Ice Racing World Championship

References 

Ice speedway competitions
World